Michael Berman may refer to:
Michael S. Berman, American lawyer and lobbyist, former aide to Walter Mondale
Michael J. Berman, American businessman, founder of George magazine with John F. Kennedy, Jr.
Michael Berman, California political consultant and brother of Rep. Howard Berman